Archelaus was the Macedonian phrourarch of the Bactrian rock called Aornos in 326 BC.

References
Who's Who in the Age of Alexander the Great, edited by Waldemar Heckel 

Phrourarchs of Alexander the Great
4th-century BC Macedonians
Hetairoi